Gambi is a French rapper and hip hop artist from Fontenay-sous-Bois. His 2019 singles "Hé oh" and "Popopop" have both topped SNEP, the French Singles Chart. Gambi started his music career in 2018 with a series of Makak clips on -YouTube. In May 2019, he was signed to the label Rec. 118, an affiliate of Warner Music France. In 2019 edition of Paris Fashion Week, he became the face of the brand AfterHomeWork.

Discography

Albums

Singles

*Did not appear in the official Belgian Ultratop 50 charts, but rather in the bubbling under Ultratip charts.

Featured in

Other charted songs

References

1998 births
Living people
People from Fontenay-sous-Bois
French rappers
Rappers from Val-de-Marne